The Circassian flag (or the Flag of Adygea) is the national flag of the Circassians. It consists of a green field charged with twelve gold stars, nine forming an arc resembling a bow and three horizontal, also charged with three crossed arrows in the center. Seferbiy Zaneqo, a Circassian diplomat, is the designer of the flag. Every year, April 25 is celebrated as the Circassian flag day by Circassians.

Info

Symbolism and meaning 
The green represents nature and Islam. The golden colour represents a bright future in peace and the plentiful harvest of grain and wheat. There are twelve stars, representing the twelve provinces of Circassia. There are three arrows, a reference to Adyghe Xabze in which they would mean "peace if you are my friend, war if you attack me".

History and usage

Creation of the flag 
An invasion of Circassia by Russia started in 1763, and since then, the Circassians have been fighting the Russo-Circassian War in defense of their territory. The Treaty of Adrianople was signed on 14 September 1829, which stated that the Ottoman Empire recognized Circassia as Russian territory. Most Circassian leaders believed the treaty was a hoax, a strategy of the Russians, as they believed that the Ottoman Empire would never abandon the Circassians. It was decided to send a delegation to the Ottoman sultan to examine the accuracy of the news.

Seferbiy Zaneqo was chosen as one of the delegates. Their mission was to meet with the Ottoman caliph to clarify the matter and receive a blessing. However, the Russian ambassador started pressuring the sultan to arrest them, and following this, the other delegates returned the Circassia while Zaneqo stayed.

During this time, Zaneqo was injured during a demonstration against Russian Imperialism, and was hospitalised. When a Circassian man, Muhammad Selkhur, visited him, Zaneqo presented a folded paper, and clarified that it is a prototype for a Circassian unity flag, and that during his long hospitalization, he thought considerably about a symbol for the Circassian unity and he concluded on the contents of the paper. He explained that he took inspiration from previous Circassian symbols, and that each of the twelve stars represents a Circassian tribe and they are all equally represented without prejudice. As to the crossed arrows they represent that the Circassians do not seek war, but will defend themselves when attacked. A Circassian woman from the Ottoman harem knitted the flag and sent it to Circassia.

David Urquhart self-proclaimed to be the designer of the flag, but there is no discovered evidence for his claims. The Circassian flag was mentioned and described by the traveler Edmund Spencer in 1830, Urquhart arrived in Circassia much later.

Adoption and usage of the flag 

The first copy of the flag was hand-delivered by the British delegate James Stanislaus Bell to Nour Muhammad Haghur in the Gesh Valley (in present-day Sochi). A council was held in the Psefabe Valley where representatives of the Circassian tribes met, in which the flag was presented and accepted. The flag was then flown by Khirtsizhiqo Ale to cheers from Circassian commanders and a multitude of people.

The Circassian people used this design ever since it was first adopted, including in the Russo-Circassian War. The flag is seen as one of the symbols of the Circassian nation by Circassians worldwide as well as one of the symbols of Circassian nationalism. This flag was also used by Circassians in the Circassian diaspora serving in several positions.

While the flag always survived among the Circassian diaspora, it lost its popularity in the Caucasus as a result of censorship during the Russian Empire and the Soviet Union, until it was repopularized by Ibrahim Nawurjan in 1989. Nawurjan, a history student at the Kabardino-Balkarian State University, discovered Edmund Spencer's book in the archives and resurrected the flag by painting it according to the description in the book. The flag was then adopted as a symbol of the Nalchik Circassian association. Nawurjan, a fervent Spartak Nalchik fan, helped popularize it among Spartak Nalchik supporters, and it later became popular among Circassians in the Caucasus again. On August 25, Nawurjan was killed on the Mamdzishha hill during the Abkhazian War, in which he voluntarily participated. A historical surviving copy of the flag was later discovered, and compared to Nawurjan's design as well as designs in the diaspora, with all designs being identical in essence. 

The Republic of Adygea adopted the present-day flag in a law of March 24, 1992. The proportions are 2:1.

Historical Circassian flags

Evolution of the current flag

Other flags used by Circassians

Color scheme

See also 
Flags of cities, villages and districts of Adygea

References

External links

Adygea
Adygea
Adygea
Adygea
1992 establishments in Russia
Adygea
National flags
Flags introduced in 1860